Jean-Baptiste Antoine Blatin (1841-1911) was a French politician. He served as the mayor of Clermont-Ferrand from 1884 to 1889, and as a member of the National Assembly for Puy-de-Dôme from 1885 to 1889.

References

1841 births
1911 deaths
Members of the 4th Chamber of Deputies of the French Third Republic
Mayors of Clermont-Ferrand
French Freemasons